Newman Field is a ballpark located in Sweetwater, TX and the home of the Sweetwater Mustangs baseball team in the UIL. The field was the site of the Sweetwater Pro Baseball Classic held from June 19 to June 21, 2009, the first occurrence of minor league baseball in 55 years since the Sweetwater Spudders. The series matched the Coastal Kingfish against the South Louisiana Pipeliners while Sweetwater was being auditioned for future expansion in the Continental Baseball League.

References

Baseball venues in Texas